"Something in the Orange" is a song written and recorded by American singer Zach Bryan. It was released on April 22, 2022 as the second single from his third studio album American Heartbreak. Ryan Hadlock produced the single at Bear Creek Studio. A second more raw version titled "Z&E's version" was later produced by Eddie Spear.

It was nominated for Best Country Solo Performance at the 65th Annual Grammy Awards.

Content
Zach Bryan told Today's Country Radio with Kelleigh Bannen that he wrote the song "in a cabin in Wisconsin." Bryan released two versions of the song: the original single version and an alternate mix which features just his vocals and piano. He had first released snippets of the song via social media in December 2021. Bryan also released a music video for the song containing "crowd sourced footage shot by fans" that "captures the raw and unfiltered emotion" of the song experience.

Critical reception
The New York Times wrote that the song "has become his most recognizable hit since his early songs." Rolling Stone editors described "Z&E's version" as "a heartbreaking single full of the genre's signature soul, stripped down to only an acoustic guitar and a harmonica."  BroadwayWorld described the song as "Bryan laying himself bare, willing himself to believe there's a chance of survival for an all-but-doomed relationship."

Chart performance
"Something in the Orange" is Bryan's first entry on the Billboard Hot 100, debuting on the chart dated May 7, 2022, and later peaking at number 10.

The release of "Something in the Orange" led Bryan to take the number one position on the Billboard Top Songwriters chart in mid-2022.

The single was officially serviced to mainstream country radio on October 3, 2022.

Charts

Weekly charts

Year-end charts

Certifications

References

2022 songs
2022 singles
Warner Records Nashville singles
Zach Bryan songs